Nurhan Çınar (born 1994) is a Turkish female field hockey player.

A native of Malatya, she played in the Turkey U18 girls' national team, and won the bronze medal at the 2011 EuroHockey U18 Girls' Championship III held in Smolevichi, Minsk, Belarus. She was named the Most Valuable Player. In 2012, she was with the Turkey junior women's national team, which placed second at the 2012 EuroHockey Junior Women's Championships III held on July 19–22 in Lisbon, Portugal.

Nurhan Çınar studies at the Abant İzzet Baysal University (AİBÜ) in Bolu and plays in its AIBU HighWay Outlet Women's Hockey Team. The team took part at the 2013 Eurohockey Women's Indoor Club Challenge I held on February 22–24, 2013 in Lisbon, Portugal, and became champion without losing a game. Çınar was named Top Scorer of the tournament. She won with her university team also the newly established Turkish Intercollegiate Hockey Championship held on April 4–7, 2013 at the Abant İzzet Baysal University.

Çınar is a member of Keçiören Bağlumspor's women hockey team. After winning the 2012 Turkish Field Hockey Women's Super League, her team qualified for participation at the 2013 Eurohockey Women’s Club Champions Challenge III held on May 17–20, 2013 in Porto, Portugal. They became undefeated champion, and she was selected Top Scorer with seven goals.

Achievements
  2011 EuroHockey U18 Girls' Championship III - Minsk, Belarus
  2012 EuroHockey Junior Women's Championships III - July 19–22 - Lisbon, Portugal
  2013 Eurohockey Women's Indoor Club Challenge I - February 22–24 - Lisbon, Portugal
  2013 Eurohockey Women’s Club Champions Challenge III - May 17–20 - Porto, Portugal

Honors

Club
 2013 Eurohockey Women's Indoor Club Challenge I - Lisbon, Portugal - Top Scorer
 2013 Eurohockey Women’s Club Champions Challenge III - Porto, Portugal - Top Scorer

National team
 2011 EuroHockey U18 Girls' Championship III - Minsk, Belarus - Most Valuable Player

See also
 Turkish women in sports

References

1994 births
Sportspeople from Malatya
Bolu Abant Izzet Baysal University alumni
Turkish female field hockey players
Living people